"Appointment on Route 17" is the fiftieth episode and the fifteenth episode of the third season (1988–89) of the television series The Twilight Zone. In this episode, a heart transplant causes a man to experience the romantic inclinations of the heart's original owner.

Plot
Callous businessman Tom Bennett returns to his office after recovering from a heart transplant. He begins acting uncharacteristically, loosening his necktie, spontaneously leaving the office to buy a pair of boots, ordering plants for the office, and buying his colleague Julie a hot dog for lunch. They take a walk on a beach and run into a sad-looking young woman to whom he is instantly drawn.

On a drive with his colleague Spence, they end up leaving the city and find a diner. Tom spots the woman he ran into at the beach, Mary Jo, working as a waitress. Mary Jo is disturbed by his staring at her and angered when he asks her out to dinner and refuses to take no for an answer. Despite her rebuff, he begins patronizing the diner twice a week. Julie, who has had an on-again, off-again relationship with Tom, gets jealous and confronts Tom about this. He confides in her that Mary Jo refuses to wait at his table, but he has become obsessed with her. Another waitress at the diner finally pulls him aside and explains that Mary Jo is still grieving for her boyfriend, who died in a car accident.

When Tom asks Mary Jo about her boyfriend, she says that they were childhood sweethearts. They were making plans to get married when the accident occurred. On a hunch, Tom asks what his name was. She tells him Jamie Adler, who was the donor for Tom's heart. At work, Tom's lackadaisical attitude toward business increases. Tom drives to the diner dressed in jeans and T-shirt and in a pick-up truck. He sits and waits for Mary Jo all night. She finally decides to talk to him and he tells her his life was in bad shape before, but now he has been given a second chance. Tom also promises to wait as long as it takes for her to open up to him. She reveals that Jamie similarly promised he would always be there for her.

External links
 

1988 American television episodes
The Twilight Zone (1985 TV series season 3) episodes
Television episodes about organ transplantation

fr:Le cœur a ses raisons (La Cinquième Dimension)